Belmont Hall is a historic home located at Newark in New Castle County, Delaware.  It was built between 1838 and 1844 and is a -story, gable-roofed, stuccoed brick building.  It features a porch on three sides supported by Doric order columns.  The building was renovated in 1911 in the Classical Revival style.  It was built as a private dwelling, In 1950, the University of Delaware purchased the building as a home for its president. It was later used as a dormitory for honor students.

It was added to the National Register of Historic Places in 1983.

References

Houses on the National Register of Historic Places in Delaware
Houses completed in 1845
Houses in Newark, Delaware
University of Delaware
National Register of Historic Places in New Castle County, Delaware